Oceania  is the debut studio album by New Zealand musical act Oceania, a collaboration between New Zealand vocalist Hinewehi Mohi and English producer Jaz Coleman. Sung in Māori, the album is a blend of Māori music traditions and instruments with 1990s house and pop.

Background

Hinewehi Mohi debuted as a solo musician in the early 1990s, while primarily working as a Television New Zealand producer. She met English producer Jaz Coleman of the band Killing Joke after he moved to New Zealand to become the composer-in-residence for the New Zealand Symphony Orchestra. Mohi sung at a tapu lifting ceremony for a recording studio, during which she impressed Coleman by her vocal ability.

Mohi developed songs alongside Jaz Coleman, often developing songs around an initial chorus melody composed by Mohi. Many of the songs on the album are inspired by the early life of Mohi's daughter Hineraukatauri, who was born with cerebral palsy. No instrument samples were used on the album, with all instruments performed live in studio sessions. Many taonga pūoro performed by traditional musicians were featured in the sessions, including performances by Hirini Melbourne. The name of the project, Oceania, was chosen by record executives, who wanted a name that European listeners could relate to. Mohi herself had wanted a Te Re Māori name for the project. Originally the album was planned for release in 1998, however was delayed due to the takeover of the PolyGram label by Universal Music.

Release 

Mohi arrived in Europe in August 1999 to promote the album, performing a promotional tour in Germany and the United Kingdom, and appearing on the BBC Breakfast. The album was promoted by the single "Kotahitanga (Union)", which was used to promote the All Blacks during the 1999 Rugby World Cup. During the event's opening ceeremony, Mohi was invited to sing the national anthem of New Zealand. Mohi decided to sing the anthem in Māori instead of English, which received wide backlash in the New Zealand press at the time.

The album was a commercial success in New Zealand, debuting at number 15 and immediately receiving a gold certification. The album peaked at number 14, and spent 18 weeks in the top 40 chart. Eventually, the album was certified double platinum. It was the first Māori language album to be released internationally. In 2000, the song "Pukaea" was released as the second single in Europe.

Track listing

Personnel 
Credits are adapted from the album's liner notes.

Musicians 

Jaz Coleman –  producer, writer, ocarina, classical guitar, keyboards, bass
Hinewehi Mohi –  vocals, backing vocals
Livingi Asitamoni – banjo
Inia Eruera –  haka vocals
Tumanako Farrell – backing vocals, haka vocals
Rangiiria Hedley –  taonga pūoro
Billy Laing –  guitar
Martin Lee –  oboe
Bernard Makoare –  taonga pūoro
Marcelle Mallette –  violin
Hirini Melbourne –  taonga pūoro
Angie Smith – backing vocals, haka vocals
Matai Smith –  haka vocals
Reo Takiwa – backing vocals, haka vocals
Tawhao Tioke –  Hawaiian guitar
Richard Wehi –  haka vocals

Technical 

Paddy Free –  programming
Philip Glass – executive producer
Andy Green – assistant engineer
Mark Haley –  programming
Rory Johnston – executive producer
Kurt Munkacsi – executive producer
Hugo Nicolson –  mixing (tracks 1–3, 5–11)
Jony Rockstar –  programming
Jeremy Shaw –  programming
Nigel Stone –  recording (tracks 1–9)
Jazz Summers – executive producer
Keith Uddlin – assistant engineer
Wayne Wilkins –  string recording (track 4)

Charts

Certifications

Release history

References

1999 debut albums
Universal Music Group albums
Māori-language albums